The Kapilikaya Rock Tomb is located in Kırkdilim, 27 km north of Çorum, Turkey, on a rocky, steep and rough land formed by rift valleys cracked by river, on the north- west corner of a rock which extends to the north.

It is a rock tomb of the Hellenistic period, dating back to the 2nd century B.C. The inscription "IKEZIOS" stands on the door of the tomb. The tomb is in a cube shape.

External links 

description on art of wayfaring
The Rock Tomb of Kapilikaya 

Ancient Greek archaeological sites in Turkey
Tombs in Turkey
Hellenistic sites
Çorum Province